Yuzuru Hanyuuda(羽入田 譲  born October 23, 1976) is a Japanese male skeleton racer, who took part in the 2005/2006 Skeleton World Cup trying to qualify for the 2006 Winter Olympics.

World Cup 2005/2006 results 
26th on November 10, 2005, Calgary CAN
26th on November 17, 2005, Lake Placid, New York, USA

References

External links
長野県連選手名鑑 

Living people
Japanese male skeleton racers
Year of birth missing (living people)
20th-century Japanese people
21st-century Japanese people